Pepsi on Stage is a music venue in the city of Porto Alegre, Brazil. It is located in the neighborhood of São João, near the Salgado Filho International Airport.

About
Opened in 2006, Pepsi on Stage is the first of the midsize arenas following the line of projects for PepsiCo. Built and managed by the same company that manages the Opinião, the venue also hosts conferences, awards, parties, graduations and brand and product launches.

In 2006, Pepsi made an unprecedented investment in the south of Brazil, creating Pepsi on Stage, which follows the same line of other projects that Pepsi developed in Amsterdam–Hol (Pepsi Stage), in Albany–USA (Pepsi Arena) and Indianapolis –USA (Pepsi Coliseum).

Noted performers

Akon
Alanis Morissette
Alice In Chains
Anitta
Anberlin
Arcade Fire
Avenged Sevenfold
Banda Calypso
Ben Harper
Biohazard
Bob Dylan
Beth Carvalho
Black Eyed Peas
Brujeria
Caetano Veloso
Chuck Berry
The Cranberries
Creed
Demi Lovato
Donavon Frankenreiter
Dream Theater
Evanescence
Faith No More
Fifth Harmony
Fito Páez
Franz Ferdinand
Matanza
Megadeth
Dream Theater
Joss Stone
Lauryn Hill
Legião Urbana
Lulu Santos
Maná
Matisyahu
Moby
NOFX
The Offspring
Paralamas do Sucesso
Paramore
Placebo
Queens of the Stone Age
RBD
RebeldeS
Rouge
Simple Plan
Slash
Stratovarius

References

External links
 Official Homepage

Indoor arenas in Brazil
Concert halls in Brazil
Music venues completed in 2006
Buildings and structures in Porto Alegre
Tourist attractions in Porto Alegre